Okulovsky (masculine), Okulovskaya (feminine), or Okulovskoye (neuter) is the name of several  rural localities in Russia.

Arkhangelsk Oblast
As of 2010, five rural localities in Arkhangelsk Oblast bear this name:
Okulovsky (rural locality), a village in Kamensky Selsoviet in Mezensky District
Okulovskaya, Belosludsky Selsoviet, Krasnoborsky District, Arkhangelsk Oblast, a village in Belosludsky Selsoviet of Krasnoborsky District
Okulovskaya, Permogorsky Selsoviet, Krasnoborsky District, Arkhangelsk Oblast, a village in Permogorsky Selsoviet of Krasnoborsky District
Okulovskaya, Velsky District, Arkhangelsk Oblast, a village in Pakshengsky Selsoviet of Velsky District
Okulovskaya, Verkhnetoyemsky District, Arkhangelsk Oblast, a village in Vyysky Selsoviet of Verkhnetoyemsky District

Vologda Oblast
As of 2010, five rural localities in Vologda Oblast bear this name:
Okulovskoye, Vologda Oblast, a village in Dvinitsky Selsoviet of Sokolsky District
Okulovskaya, Tarnogsky District, Vologda Oblast, a village in Ilezsky Selsoviet of Tarnogsky District
Okulovskaya, Nizhneslobodsky Selsoviet, Vozhegodsky District, Vologda Oblast, a village in Nizhneslobodsky Selsoviet of Vozhegodsky District
Okulovskaya, Ramensky Selsoviet, Vozhegodsky District, Vologda Oblast, a village in Ramensky Selsoviet of Vozhegodsky District
Okulovskaya, Yavengsky Selsoviet, Vozhegodsky District, Vologda Oblast, a village in Yavengsky Selsoviet of Vozhegodsky District